Batjac Productions is an independent film production company co-founded by John Wayne in 1952 as a vehicle for Wayne to both produce and star in movies.   The first Batjac production was Big Jim McLain released by Warner Bros. in 1952, and its final film was McQ, in 1974, also distributed by Warner Bros. After John Wayne's death in 1979, his son Michael Wayne owned and managed the company until his own death in 2003, when his wife Gretchen assumed ownership.

About the company
Wayne and producer Robert Fellows founded Batjac in 1952 as Wayne/Fellows Productions. When Fellows left the company several years later, Wayne renamed the corporation after a fictitious trading company mentioned in the film Wake of the Red Witch (1948). The company name in Wake of the Red Witch was spelled Batjak, but Wayne's secretary misspelled it as Batjac on the corporation papers, and Wayne let it stand. Having his own company was intended to give Wayne artistic control over the films he made.

The best known of all Batjac's films is Wayne's version of The Alamo (1960), a project he had planned for several years. It was an account of the battle of the Alamo during the Texas Revolution of 1836.  A labor of love for Wayne, The Alamo cost Wayne much of his personal fortune. Among Batjac's other productions are Hondo, Cahill U.S. Marshal, Big Jake, McLintock!, The Green Berets, Seven Men from Now, and McQ.

The "lost" Wayne films
Because of a production/distribution deal with Warner Bros. and United Artists, Batjac was allowed to retain all rights to four Wayne films — The High and the Mighty, Hondo, Island in the Sky, distributed by Warner Bros.; and McLintock!, distributed by United Artists. It also held full copyright ownership in several non-Wayne movies, Seven Men from Now, Man in the Vault, Ring of Fear, Plunder of the Sun, Track of the Cat, China Doll, Escort West, and Gun the Man Down.

After Wayne's death in 1979, his son Michael Wayne gained full ownership and managed the company until he died in 2003. He meticulously managed the release pattern of his father's films and restored Hondo and McLintock! in the early 1990s for release on VHS and television. His passion was to restore the other two films, but water damage to the original elements made it impossible during his lifetime.  Taking advantage of the new digital restoration processes, Michael's widow Gretchen restored these films in 2004 and released them through a distribution deal with Paramount Pictures in 2005. Although now released by Paramount, the Batjac films originally distributed by Warner Bros. still retained their original "WB Shield" logos, as part of a cross-licensing deal between the two companies- which also permitted the use of the original Paramount Pictures logos on the Warner-owned Fleischer/Famous Studios Popeye the Sailor cartoons.

List of Batjac productions

List of John Wayne productions at Republic Pictures

John Wayne served as Producer for Republic Pictures on the following films, prior to the founding of Wayne-Fellows/Batjac Productions in 1952.

 
Film production companies of the United States
Defunct companies based in Greater Los Angeles
Mass media companies established in 1952
1952 establishments in California
John Wayne
American independent film studios